Juan Crisóstomo Vélez de Guevara (Madrid, 1611 – íbid., 20 November 1675), son of Luis Vélez de Guevara, was, like his father, a playwright of the Spanish Golden Age.

Like his father Luis, Juan Vélez entered the service of the Duque de Veragua as a lawyer, and from there in 1642 succeeded his father as an Usher of the Royal Chamber. Well known in his day as a composer of short theatrical pieces, notably entremeses and bailes, many of them performed at the Spanish Court, Vélez junior likewise wrote and published full-length plays such as El diciembre por agosto, Nuestra Señora de las Nieves (1637), Endimión y la luna (1656), and the zarzuela Los celos hacen estrella (1672).

He also wrote, in collaboration, Amor vencido de Amor (with Juan de Zabaleta and Antonio de la Huerta); La verdad en el engaño (with Jerónimo de Cáncer and Martínez de Meneses); the burlesque Los siete infantes de Lara (1650, with Jerónimo de Cáncer); and La cortesana en la sierra and El hidalgo de La Mancha (with Juan Bautista Diamante and Juan de Matos Fragoso).

Sources 
 Javier Huerta Calvo dir., Historia del teatro español, Madrid, Gredos, 2003.

1611 births
1675 deaths
Spanish male dramatists and playwrights
17th-century Spanish writers
17th-century Spanish dramatists and playwrights
17th-century male writers